Þórshöfn Airport  is an airport located in Þórshöfn, a village in northeast Iceland. It is also referred to as Thorshofn Airport in many English-language sources.

Overview
It had a slightly shorter runway with a gravel surface, which has since been closed. The airport has a very small terminal building of around 12×9 meters (39×29 ft). Domestic airports don't need security checks in Iceland, and the 19-seat Twin Otter aircraft used don't need large terminals.

Airlines and destinations

Statistics

Passengers and movements

Accidents and incidents  

In July 1969, Douglas R4D-6 Bu 150187 of the United States Navy was damaged beyond economic repair in an accident at Þórshöfn Airport. Pilot Russell W. Sims Jr, Executive Officer of NAS Keflavik, was flying in supplies and mail when cross winds, unimproved runway surface coupled with what the investigative report stated was pilot error was not able to keep control of the plane upon landing, going off the runway surface and destroying the landing gear. Another source states that the aircraft swung off the runway during takeoff.

Notes

References

External links 
 
 Aerial picture of the new Þórshöfn Airport (BITN), viewing south with the town of Þórshöfn in the background 2 nm away
 Aerial picture of the old Þórshöfn Airport (BITH).

Airports in Iceland